John P. Cassidy  (1855 – July 3, 1891) was an American outfielder in Major League Baseball from  to .  He was a pitcher in his first season, 1875, with the Brooklyn Atlantics but went 1–21 that season and was moved to the outfield the following year.

Cassidy died at the age of 36 in his hometown of Brooklyn, New York of dropsy, and is interred at Flatbush Cemetery.

References

External links

 John Cassidy's Obit, The Sporting News, July 4, 1891

1855 births
1891 deaths
Major League Baseball outfielders
Major League Baseball pitchers
19th-century baseball players
Brooklyn Atlantics players
New Haven Elm Citys players
Hartford Dark Blues players
Chicago White Stockings players
Troy Trojans players
Providence Grays players
Brooklyn Atlantics (AA) players
Brooklyn Grays players
Sportspeople from Brooklyn
Baseball players from New York City
Deaths from edema
Springfield (minor league baseball) players